Dippoldiswalde (Saxon: Dipps) is a town in Saxony, Germany, part of the Sächsische Schweiz-Osterzgebirge district. It is situated 23 km east of Freiberg, and 18 km south of Dresden.

The town is situated on the Weisseritz railway, a narrow gauge railway powered by steam locomotives.

References 

Populated places in Sächsische Schweiz-Osterzgebirge